Mats Fredrik Nyberg (born 23 March 1969) is a former Swedish alpine skier.

He was born in Skön (Sundsvall).

Excelling in giant slalom and super-G, he won a total of seven World Cup races in those disciplines. He took part in a total of five Winter Olympics; his 5th-place finish in the 2006 Olympic giant slalom was his best Olympic result.

Nyberg planned to end his career after the 2006–07 season, but crashed during practive in Austria on 10 November 2006, causing a serious knee injury. The injury forced him to end his career at the age of 37 without a start in his last season.

World Cup victories

References

External links
 
 
 

1969 births
Swedish male alpine skiers
Alpine skiers at the 1992 Winter Olympics
Alpine skiers at the 1994 Winter Olympics
Alpine skiers at the 1998 Winter Olympics
Alpine skiers at the 2002 Winter Olympics
Alpine skiers at the 2006 Winter Olympics
Olympic alpine skiers of Sweden
People from Sundsvall Municipality
Living people
Sportspeople from Västernorrland County